The Taş Tepeler (Turkish, literally 'Stone Hills') is an upland area in the Southeastern Anatolia Region of Turkey, near the city of Şanlıurfa.  

The area has a number of significant prehistoric archaeological sites, including twelve sites with the characteristic "T"-shaped obelisks well known from Göbekli Tepe, a UNESCO World Heritage Site: Göbekli Tepe, Nevalı Çori, Şanlıurfa – Yeni Mahalle, Karahan Tepe, Hamzan Tepe, Sefer Tepe, Taşlı Tepe, Kurt Tepe, Harbetsuvan Tepe, Sayburç and Ayanlar Höyük. The obelisks are characteristic of the Pre-Pottery Neolithic period in the region. It appears that these settlements were covered with soil and abandoned, with all seeming to have disappeared by the end of the Pre-Pottery Neolithic B period.

A summary of the recent discoveries was written by British author and journalist Sean Thomas (author) and published in The Spectator in 2022.

References 

Archaeological sites in Southeastern Anatolia
Former populated places in Turkey
Geography of Şanlıurfa Province
History of Şanlıurfa Province
Neolithic